Lạc Hồng University is a private university in Đồng Nai Province.

As an educational establishment with interdisciplinary and multi-level training, LHU offers programs in vocational training, college, bachelor of arts and postgraduate degrees. It has 12 faculties and 21 majors with an enrollment of more than 20,000 students.

References

External links
 Website Đại Học Lạc Hồng — Lac Hong University
 Furniturebt

Universities in Vietnam